Gun laws in Washington regulate the sale, possession, and use of firearms and ammunition in the state of Washington in the United States.

The Constitution of Washington protects an individual's right to bear arms. Washington preempts localities from regulating firearms in any manner more restrictive than State law except as explicitly authorized by the State legislature. Authorized local firearm regulations include:
"Restricting the discharge of firearms in any portion of their respective jurisdictions where there is a reasonable likelihood that humans, domestic animals, or property will be jeopardized. Such laws and ordinances shall not abridge the right of the individual guaranteed by Article I, section 24 of the state Constitution to bear arms in defense of self or others."
"Restricting the possession of firearms in any stadium or convention center, operated by a city, town, county, except that such restrictions shall not apply to concealed pistol license holders, law enforcement officers, or any showing, demonstration, or lecture involving the exhibition of firearms."
"Restricting the areas in their respective jurisdictions in which firearms may be sold."

There are some age restrictions on the possession of firearms and some people are prohibited from possessing firearms due to certain criminal convictions or who are released on bond or their own recognizance pending trial for certain criminal charges. Since July 1, 1994, machine guns, short-barreled shotguns, and any parts thereof are prohibited. Suppressors and short-barreled rifles may be possessed and used in accordance with federal law. Pistols transferred through an F.F.L. dealer must be registered with Washington State D.O.L.

There are places where the possession or storage of firearms or ammunition is prohibited or otherwise restricted. Statutory law prohibits firearms in places such as areas of buildings used for court proceedings, certain areas of public mental health facilities, establishments which serve alcohol and are off-limits to persons under 21 years of age, restricted-access areas of commercial airports, State correctional facilities, and outdoor music festivals. Administrative law prohibits or otherwise restricts the possession or storage of firearms in places such as certain schools, premises of the Office of Administrative Hearings, child care centers, horse races, near certain explosive materials, and certain shelters for respite or youths. See the Washington 'infobox' or one of this section's referenced documents for the complete list as well as where exceptions apply for those who hold concealed pistol licenses.

As a general rule, a person may legally open-carry without a permit in Washington state in any place it is legal to possess a loaded handgun, as long as it does not manifest "an intent to intimidate another or [warrant] alarm for the safety of other persons." A properly holstered visible handgun will not generally fall under that clause. To open-carry a loaded handgun in a vehicle (e.g, car, bus, etc ...) a person must have a valid concealed pistol license. The county sheriff or city police chief shall issue a concealed pistol license to any applicant, age 21 or older, who meets certain requirements, including no felony convictions, no misdemeanor domestic violence convictions, and no outstanding warrants. Open carrying of firearms without a permit is not prohibited by state law.

In Washington, the police may temporarily seize guns from people a judge deems a threat to themselves or others. Law enforcement personnel may alert mental health professionals, who can determine if someone is a threat or needs involuntary treatment. The police must notify any family or household members who want to know about a gun being returned to the person from whom it was taken away.

Several new gun control provisions were enacted when I-1639 was approved by the voters in November 2018. These include increased background checks, firearm safety training, a waiting period and a 21 years old age minimum before buying semi-automatic rifles, new age limitations on who may purchase or possess certain firearms, including prohibiting some firearm purchases by persons under age 21, and require certain secured firearm storage or trigger-locks, and criminalizing certain firearm storage if it results in unauthorized use. Some local counties have adopted Second Amendment sanctuary resolutions in opposition.

Concealed weapon reciprocity
Washington concealed pistol licenses will be recognized in the following states, and concealed weapons licenses issued in the listed states will be recognized in Washington State, so long as the handgun is carried in accordance with Washington law: Idaho (Idaho Enhanced Permit only), Kansas, Louisiana, Michigan (non-resident concealed pistol licenses issued by Washington state are not recognized by Michigan), North Carolina, North Dakota (Class 1 North Dakota permits only), Ohio, Oklahoma, South Dakota (South Dakota Enhanced Permit only. Restricted 18 to 20 year old Enhanced Permit is not recognized by Washington) and Utah.

Washington state law also carves exemptions into state law regarding Concealed Pistol Licenses. RCW 9.41.060, section 8: "Any person engaging in a lawful outdoor recreational activity such as hunting, fishing, camping, hiking, or horseback riding, only if, considering all of the attendant circumstances, including but not limited to whether the person has a valid hunting or fishing license, it is reasonable to conclude that the person is participating in lawful outdoor activities or is traveling to or from a legitimate outdoor recreation area." 

Washington is a "stand your ground" state, in which there is no duty to retreat in the face of what would be perceived by an ordinary person to be a threat to themselves or others by another person that is likely to cause serious injury or death. It is a gross misdemeanor to aim a firearm "whether loaded or not, at or towards any human being". Unless the person is acting in self-defense, they can be charged with "brandishing" and threatening someone with a deadly weapon.

Summary table

See also
 Law of Washington (state)

References

Washington (state) law
Washington